Chris Lilley may refer to:

Chris Lilley (comedian) (born 1974), Australian comedian
Chris Lilley (computer scientist) (born 1959), technical director, W3C